Mare Vaporum  (Latin vapōrum, the "sea of vapors") is a lunar mare located between the southwest rim of Mare Serenitatis and the southeast rim of Mare Imbrium. It was named by Giovanni Battista Riccioli in 1651.

The mare lies in an old basin or crater that is within the Procellarum basin. In the south of the mare is Rima Hyginus, a rille intersected by the crater Hyginus. The lunar material surrounding the mare is from the Lower Imbrian epoch, and the mare material is from the Eratosthenian epoch.

References

External links

Mare Vaporum at The Moon Wiki
Dome in Mare Vaporum - Hook and Dome area
 
 

Vaporum
Smythii